
Laram Quta (Aymara larama blue, quta lake, "blue lake", hispanicized spelling Laram Kkota) is a lake in Bolivia located in the La Paz Department, Pedro Domingo Murillo Province, El Alto Municipality. It lies south of the mountain Chacaltaya, south-east of Milluni Lake, south-west of the Qillwani Lakes  and north-west of Qillwani (Khelluani). Laram Quta is situated at a height of about 4,556 metres (14,948 ft), about 0,5 km long and 0,17 km at its widest point.

Gallery

See also 
 Janq'u Quta (El Alto)
 Phaq'u Quta

References 

Lakes of La Paz Department (Bolivia)